The Japanese word Heian (平安, lit. "peace") may refer to:

 Heian period, an era of Japanese history
 Heian-kyō, the Heian-period capital of Japan that has become the present-day city of Kyoto
 Heian series, a group of karate kata (forms)
 Heian Shrine, a large shrine in the city of Kyoto
 "Heian", a song from the 2016 Momus album Scobberlotchers

See also

 Ping'an (disambiguation), the Chinese pinyin transliteration of 平安
 Pyongan, the Korean hanja transliteration of 平安